Vicente Bokalic Iglic C.M. (June 11, 1952) is a prelate of the Roman Catholic Church. He served as auxiliary bishop of Buenos Aires from 2010 until 2013, when he became bishop of Santiago del Estero.

Life 
Born in Buenos Aires, Iglic became a member of the Congregation of the Mission on June 5, 1976. He was ordained to the priesthood on April 11, 1978.

On March 15, 2010, he was appointed auxiliary bishop of Buenos Aires and titular bishop of Summa. Iglic received his episcopal consecration on the following May 29 from Jorge Mario Bergoglio, archbishop of Buenos Aires, the later pope Francis, with archbishop of Corrientes, Andrés Stanovnik, and bishop of Santa Rosa, Mario Aurelio Poli, serving as co-consecrators.

On December 23, 2013, he was appointed bishop of Santiago del Estero, where he was installed on March 9, 2014.

External links 
 catholic-hierarchy.org, Bishop Vicente Bokalic Iglic

1952 births
21st-century Roman Catholic bishops in Argentina
Argentine people of Croatian descent
Living people
Vincentians
Roman Catholic bishops of Santiago del Estero